The Casamonica clan is an Italian criminal organization present in Rome and operating in the area of the Castelli Romani and the Lazio coast.

Origins
The Casamonica clan originates from the Casamonica and Di Silvio families, families of sedentary Sinti originating from Abruzzo and Molise, who came from Pescara and Venafro to the capital in the fifties.

The group is made up of the members of these families, with occasional relations with other Sinti families such as the De Rosa, the Di Guglielmo, the Di Rocco, the Ciarelli, the Di Colombi, the Di Lauro, the Zini, the Spada and the Spinelli; they also rely on the Seferović of Bosnian origin.

Areas of activity
The traditional cornerstones of the mafia clan are the areas located in the south-eastern outskirts of Rome: Romanina, Anagnina, Porta Furba, Tuscolano, Spinaceto, and further south, in other municipalities up to Frascati and Monte Compatri.

According to the Anti-Mafia Investigation Directorate (DIA), the Casamonica clan is the most powerful and rooted criminal structure in the Region of Lazio, with estimated assets amounting to 90 million euros. According to a census by Vittorio Rizzi, head of the Rome mobile team (Squadra Mobile, a division of State Police), the clan is made up of around a thousand affiliates.

Activities
The Casamonica clan was associated with racketeering, extortion and usury for decades, with very little public exposure until a lavish funeral for crime boss Vittorio Casamonica caused outrage in 2015.  The clan is known for ostentatious funerals and garishly decorated villas. Illegally built villas in the Quadraro district were demolished in 2018 during the incumbency of Virginia Raggi as mayor of  Rome. In June 2022, eleven clan members were facing trial over electricity theft.

References

1970 establishments in Italy
Organised crime groups in Italy
Romani organized crime groups